Glossanodon is a genus of fishes in the family Argentinidae.

Extant species 
There are currently 15 recognized extant species in this genus:
 Glossanodon australis Kobyliansky, 1998 (Southern herring smelt)
 Glossanodon danieli Parin & Shcherbachev, 1982
 Glossanodon elongatus Kobyliansky, 1998
 Glossanodon kotakamaru Endo & Nashida, 2010 (Kotaka’s argentine)
 Glossanodon leioglossus (Valenciennes, 1848) (Small-toothed argentine)
 Glossanodon lineatus (Matsubara, 1943)
 Glossanodon melanomanus Kobyliansky, 1998
 Glossanodon microcephalus Endo & Nashida, 2012
 Glossanodon mildredae Cohen & Atsaides, 1969
 Glossanodon nazca Parin & Shcherbachev, 1982
 Glossanodon polli Cohen, 1958
 Glossanodon pseudolineatus Kobyliansky, 1998 (Saddled herring smelt)
 Glossanodon pygmaeus Cohen, 1958 (Pygmy argentine)
 Glossanodon semifasciatus (Kishinouye, 1904) (Deep-sea smelt)
 Glossanodon struhsakeri Cohen, 1970 (Struhsaker's deep-sea smelt)

Fossil species 
From the fossil record, two species are known, originally described as Proargentina inclinata (Danilt'chenko 1960) and P. nebulosa (Danilt'chenko 1962) from the Early Oligocene and Early Eocene Dabakhana Svita Formation of Georgia respectively. Jerzmanska assigned Proargentina synonymous with Glossanodon in 1968.

References

Bibliography 
 

Argentinidae
Extant Ypresian first appearances
Taxa named by Alphonse Guichenot
Fish described in 1867